Jack Liddle (20 October 1910 – 1997) was a Canadian middle-distance runner. He competed in the men's 800 metres at the 1936 Summer Olympics.

References

External links
 

1910 births
1997 deaths
Athletes (track and field) at the 1936 Summer Olympics
Canadian male middle-distance runners
Olympic track and field athletes of Canada
Place of birth missing